"Piazza, New York Catcher" is a song by Scottish band Belle and Sebastian, first appearing on their 2003 album Dear Catastrophe Waitress. The song details the band's lead singer Stuart Murdoch's romance of his future wife in San Francisco. 

The song takes it name from MLB catcher Mike Piazza, who at the time played for the New York Mets, and discusses rumors of Piazza's sexuality. Murdoch said of Piazza, after seeing him play at Shea Stadium, "I was almost instantly drawn to Piazza. That’s the thing about him; he was a talisman wherever he went. He was the kind of player people tended to follow, and we thought he was a good guy."

The song appeared on the soundtrack of the 2007 film Juno.

References 

2003 songs
Belle and Sebastian songs
Baseball songs and chants